Jan Zdeněk Bartoš (4 June 1908, Dvůr Králové nad Labem – 1 June 1981, Prague) was a Czech composer.

Biography 
Bartoš started to play the violin as a pupil of Karel Hršel in Hradec Králové. In 1924, after he graduated from business school, Bartoš left for France. He played as a concertmaster of the Messageries Maritimes naval company in Marseille. From 1929 to 1931 he travelled with that company to Africa, Asia and Madagascar. Following his return, he studied music theory with Otakar Šín and Jaroslav Křička at the Prague Conservatory. He graduated in 1943. From 1956 he worked at the Czech Ministry of Education and taught composition and music theory at the Prague Conservatory.

He composed two operas, an operetta, four symphonies, chamber music, cantatas, songs cycles and theatre music. His work was also part of the music event in the art competition at the 1948 Summer Olympics.

Selected works 
Stage
 Král manéže (Master of the Ring), Burlesque Ballet-Pantomime in 14 scenes
 Prokletý zámek (The Cursed Mansion), Opera in 1 act (1951); libretto by Zdeněk Lorenc

Orchestra
 Symphony No.1 for large orchestra, Op.65 (1952)
 Symphony No.2 for (chamber) orchestra, Op.78 (1956–1957)
 Symphony No.3 for string orchestra (1964–1965)
 Symphony No.5 
 Symphony No.6 for brass quartet and string orchestra (1974)
 Symphony No.7 (1977)

Concert band
 Z podkrkonošského špalíčku (1973)

Concertante
 Introdukce a rondo (Introduction and Rondo) for violin and orchestra, Op.13 (1937)
 Concertino for bassoon and orchestra, Op.34 (1943)
 Staří přátele (Old Friends), Concertante Suite for viola, double bass and 9 wind instruments (1964)
 Symphony No.4, Concertante Symphony for oboe d'amore and string orchestra (1968)
 Concerto da camera for viola and string orchestra (1970)
 Concerto for violin and string orchestra (1972)
 Concerto per "Due Boemi" for bass clarinet, piano and string orchestra (1975)
 Koncert pro trio for violin, viola, cello and string orchestra (1975)
 Sonata for Trombone, 12 strings and piano (1978)
 Capriccio concertant for oboe and chamber orchestra (1979)

Chamber music
 Partita for viola solo, Op.36 (1944)
 String Quartet No.2, Op.43 (1946)
 Sonatina for viola and piano, Op.46 (1947)
 Duet for 2 violins, Op.60 (1951)
 String Quartet No.3
 String Quartet No.4
 String Quartet No.5 „Aby celý svět byl zahradou“ (Were the Whole World a Garden), Op.66 (1952)
 Elegie for cello and piano (or organ) (1952)
 Divertimento No.1 for flute, 2 oboes, 2 clarinets, 2 horns and 2 bassoons (1960)
 Piano Quartet, Op.81
 Trio for violin, viola and harp (1961)
 Preludia (Preludes) for flute and piano (1963)
 Musica piccola, Suite for student violin ensemble and piano (1964)
 Trio for violin, viola and cello, Op.123 (1967)
 Miniatury (Miniatures), Instructive Pieces for cello and piano (1970)
 Adagio Elegiaco and Rondo for horn and piano (1974)
 Nonet No.2 for flute, oboe, clarinet, bassoon, horn, violin, viola, cello, double bass (1974)
 Piano Trio No.2 (1974)
 Deset skladbiček (10 Little Pieces) for 3 recorders (1976)
 Fantazie for viola solo (1980)
 Tercettino for oboe, clarinet and bassoon (1981)
 Divertimento No.7 for 3 clarinets
 String Quartet No.6 „In miniatura“
 String Quartet No.7 „Quator Wegimont“
 String Quartet No.8, Op.86
 String Quartet No.9
 String Quartet No.10
 String Quartet No.11

Piano
 Dvouhlasé invence (2-Part Inventions) for piano, Op.5
 Maličkosti (Bagatelles) for piano (1947)
 Sonata No.1 for Piano (1956)
 Sonata No.2 „Giocosa“ for piano, Op.82 (1959)

Vocal
 Meditace na Štursova "Raněného" (Meditation on Jan Štursa's "The Wounded") for mezzo-soprano and string orchestra (or string quartet), Op.76 (1956); words by Renata Pandulová
 Dětem (To Children), Song Cycle on Words by Zdeněk Kriebl for soprano and piano (1972)

Choral
 Píseň domova (Song of Home) for mixed chorus (1969); words by Vladimír Stuchl

References

External links 
 List of compositions on Musicbase.cz

1908 births
1981 deaths
20th-century classical composers
Czech classical composers
Czech male classical composers
Czech opera composers
Male opera composers
People from Dvůr Králové nad Labem
Prague Conservatory alumni
Male composers
20th-century Czech male musicians
Olympic competitors in art competitions